Mehmet Emin or Mehmed Emin is a Turkish given name for males, made up of the two names Mehmed and Emin. People with the name include:

 Mehmed Emîn Bozarslan (born 1935), Kurdish writer
 Mehmet Emin Bughra (1901–1965), Uyghur separatist
 Mehmet Emin Çolakoğlu (1878–1939), Turkish general
 Mehmet Emin Karamehmet (born 1944), Turkish businessman
 Mehmet Emin Koral (1881–1959), Turkish general
 Mehmet Emin Resulzade (1864–1955), Azerbaijani statesman
 Mehmet Emin Toprak (1974–2002), Turkish actor
 Mehmet Emin Tokadi (1664–1745), Ottoman Sufi cleric
 Mehmet Emin Yurdakul (1869–1944), Turkish writer
 Mehmet Emin Yazgan (1876–1961), Turkish general
 Mehmed Emin Pasha (disambiguation)

See also
 Mehmed
 Emin (given name)

Turkish masculine given names